Devou Park is a city park in Covington, Kentucky. With , it is the city's largest park. The hilltop park's overlooks offer panoramic views of the Cincinnati skyline and the Ohio River valley below. It is the namesake of the nearby city of Park Hills.

History
In 1910, William P. and Charles P. Devou  donated to the city  of land for the establishment of the park, on the condition it be named in memory of their parents. Devou Park hosted an annual egg fight on Easter Sunday in the 1930s.

Amenities
The park contains nature trails, playgrounds, and an 18-hole golf course. The park's Behringer-Crawford Museum details the natural history of the area. The Drees Pavilion, a banquet hall, is located in Devou Park. All proceeds from the hall are donated for the park maintenance fund.

Sports Events
 From 2014 to 2016 the Pan American Cyclo-cross Championships were held in the park.

References

Covington, Kentucky
Geography of Kenton County, Kentucky
Parks in Kentucky